Rey Yan is the fictional protagonist of the manhwa series Chronicles of the Cursed Sword by Yeo Beop-ryong and Park Hui-jin (art).  

A boy with a dark sad and mysterious past,  travels wielding the powerful Pasa sword.  Early on unknown to himself, he wields great deep power within himself.

History
Six years before the start of the series, Rey's parents died from an epidemic.  He and his sister, Mey, drifted around and eventually came to the capital city. Rey and his sister were brought along with thousands of other orphans under false pretense of care and shelter.  There at the "Gigantic Pagoda" in which the Prime Minister resides, all the orphans were locked in a dark room and each was given a sword.  Being told them that if they wanted to get out, they would have to fight.  For months they fought and the children became relentless, greedy, and violent, driven by the scarcity of food provided for them.  Survivors were eventually swallowed up by a dark entity and were lost in the darkness.  Mey was eventually swallowed up and Rey soon followed.  After the ordeal, he awoke with a demon stone embedded into his forehead.

After some time, Master Loruan and his disciple, Shyao, found Rey, who was holding the Pasa sword.  They witnessed Rey among hordes of slain demons across the field.  Loruan saved him from insanity and raised Rey as one of his own disciples.  Loruan was eventually killed by White Tiger, who sought the Pasa sword.  Loruan sacrificed himself using a forbidden spell in order for Rey and Shyao to escape with the Pasa sword.

Summary
Six years later, at the start of the series, he travels with Shyao Lin.  Though Shyao denies any feelings for Rey and claims to be his 'older sister', Rey begins to feel something for her, quite obviously.  He wields an immensely powerful sword, The Pasa sword, with the power to consume demons' blood and souls to augment its powers.  After Shyao's betrayal, he retreats into the mountains and becomes a listless wanderer, barely even interested in killing the demons there for a time.

Personality
Rey Yan undergoes a somewhat dramatic change from the beginning of the manhwa.  According to the description of Rey in the character files drawn by Hui-Jin at the end of volume eight, Rey is described as having; 'a tough, almost twisted personality, but remnants of his original understanding character still shine through. He is quick to anger but doesn't hold grudges... Making new friends has made him mellower... Hui-Jin also reveals that Rey 'has a soft spot for women', and can be a bit shy around them (especially Shyao). 

Even as early on in the series as up to volume eight, Rey's kind personality shines through. In the first volume, he seems almost inhuman, but later on, he becomes more open to people.

Powers
Rey makes remarkable progress using Chan Kaihu's chastity technique. One of the more powerful techniques that Rey learns in 'Moonbeams Slice Through the Night Air' (or so-called in the English version). This power lets you cut through anything. Rey uses this to tremendously weaken the powerful Sorcerer of the Dark in a battle with him. Rey's other 'powers' are what Ban-Go and the PaSa sword provide him with, along with decent swordsmanship and some raw strength.

Pasa Sword
Rey is beginning to merge more and more with the Pasa sword spirit and can interact with and threaten him. At one point he is even let into the demon's memories against his will. The two are quite alike, both being hot-blooded and as Rey mentions to the demon; 'You're not the only one here with a dark past.

Chan Kaihu's techniques
As the series progresses, Rey continues to learn new techniques. One such technique is "A spell to shatter diamonds," in which a giant explosion is created by harnessing the earth element. The technique "Moonbeams Slice through the Night Air", is only the first of five techniques in the Metal element techniques described in the "Tome of Heaven and Hell. The "Dance of the Blaizing Shadows ", is a technique based on the fundamental distinction between reality and illusion that tricks the opponent into thinking that the illusion is the real you.

Appearance
Throughout the series, Rey's appearance changes drastically.  These changes seem like it is coming from the merge between Rey and the Pasa sword's demon spirit, but also something deep within Rey is slowly surfacing.

Volume 1, Rey's eyes become cloudy and Spirit speaks through him
Volume 3, Spirit took over when the Dervishes though Rey was beat. His eyes became completely pupiless and he only regained control when MinXia intervened to remind him about Shyao. Rey enters Sheyshen's dimension and his physical form immediately changes, he now has red eyes, markings all over his body, claws, and spikes growing from his wrists. After Sheyshen lands her first punch on him, the PaSa sword takes over and Rey has no memory of the possession afterwards.
Volume 4, Spirit takes on a sprite form outside of Rey's body.
Volume 5, Spirit  appears for a brief moment and the PaSa sword attacks Hyacia on his command.
Volume 8, After learning of Shyao's betrayal (and being impaled), Spirit actually takes on a visible form (not the sprite this time) and controls Rey like a puppet. He is able to unleash powerful attacks without the use of the PaSa sword and Rey only regains his senses seconds before he would have taken off Shyao's head.
Volume 9, When Louen and Moa meet Rey, there are still markings all over his face and he wears a bandage over one eye because it is still demonic from the last possession. Spirit can now maintain a physical form when not possessing Rey but Rey has insight into his memories against his will. The PaSa sword can travel long distances now without Rey.
Volume 14, During the battle against the Sorcerer King, Ban-Go's spirit is partially awoken. Rey's entire body is turned black with the exception of his left eye. Later in the battle uses the "Armor of Creation", giving Rey armor on his left side. He loses the demon stone on his forehead after the battle with the sorcerers because all of his powers have become one, according to the PaSa sword spirit.

Ban-Go
Ban-go is the creator God that formed the universe at the dawn of time. It is said that his body formed the earth while his spirit rose up and formed the heavens while his soul took in everything evil and became the demon realm. Shiyan put Ban-Go's soul in Rey hoping that his brother which is the Pasa sword spirit would take over Rey when the power awakened so they could exact their revenge on the Demon emperor that betrayed them.

Relationships
Shyao: Rey very clearly is in love with Shyam, though she has tried to kill him. After she failed to kill him, he was heartbroken and would rather not meet her again.
Hyacia: He does not seem to have the same feeling for 'Hyacia', as she clearly does. Though he gets horribly flustered when embarrassed in front of her. Later it is hinted that he has fallen for her since he called her "someone he cares".

Orphan characters in comics